United Nations Security Council Resolution 215, adopted on November 5, 1965, after the cease-fire called for in resolutions 209, 210, 211 and 214 and agreed to by India and Pakistan failed to materialize, the Council demanded that representatives of India and Pakistan meet with a representative of the Secretary-General to purpose schedules for the withdrawals.  The Council urged this meeting to take place as soon as possible and requested the Secretary-General to submit a report on compliance with this resolution.

The resolution was adopted with nine votes to two; Jordan and the Soviet Union abstained.

See also
Indo-Pakistani War of 1965
Kashmir conflict
List of United Nations Security Council Resolutions 201 to 300 (1965–1971)

References
Text of the Resolution at undocs.org

External links
 

 0215
Indo-Pakistani War of 1965
 0215
November 1965 events